Werethekau (Egyptian: wrt-hk3w "great one of magic, great enchantress"; alternately Urthekau, Weret Hekau) was an ancient Egyptian deity. She served as the personification of supernatural powers.

In myth

As a deity dedicated to protection, she often appeared on funerary objects, particularly weapons, to allow the deceased to protect him or herself against the dangers of the underworld. She also was placed on ivory knives as a charm to protect pregnant and nursing mothers.

Her power was one of the inherent qualities of the Crowns of Egypt. As goddess of the crowns she was a snake or a lion-headed woman and dwelt in the state sanctuary.  As the wife of Ra-Horakhty she is depicted with his solar disk on her head. Werethekau was an epithet frequently conferred on Isis, Sekhmet, Mut, and others.

See also
 Eye of Horus

References

Egyptian goddesses
Magic goddesses